Anjali Lavania is an Indian model, a holistic life coach and a film actress. She made her acting debut in the 2011 Telugu film Panjaa, starring Pawan Kalyan.

Career
Anjali Lavania hails from Mumbai, Maharashtra, India. Her mother is a well known model and Miss Cochin from Kerala, while her father is from Nainital and served the Indian Navy as a Naval Aviator.

Anjali, started off as a model for Roopam campaign and Sheetal Design Studio at Mumbai. Anjali is particularly active in the Eco-Green movement, she was featured in the Los Angeles Times for the Eco-nouveau show, during LA fashion week adorning the bridal, newspaper ensemble by British Designer Gary Harvey that was showcased at the MOMA in NYC.

Anjali has modeled internationally for fashion designers Lotta Stensson, Ashaka Givens, Christopher Kane and Gary Harvey. She has modeled for magazines like Instyle, Marie Claire, Elle, GQ, Verve, M, Femina, Vogue. She has studied acting at the Joanne Baron, DW Brown studio.

She did the Autumn Winter campaign for Provogue. She has also modeled for Pantaloons, Mahindra Xylo, Titan with Aamir Khan and Levis with Imran Khan. She is featured in Kingfisher calendar 2010 and 2011, along with hosting the Making of the Kingfisher calendar in 2011. She was featured in the list of Times 50 Most Desirable Men & 50 Most Desirable Women of 2010.

In 2011, she was cast by director Vishnuvardhan to portray a lead female character alongside Pawan Kalyan in his Telugu directorial Panjaa.

In June 2012, Anjali won her first acting award at the very prestigious Cinemaa Awards for her Confident Debut in Panjaa opposite Pawan Kalyan. This award was presented to her by Nagarjuna.

In 2012 she was featured in Vogue's list of Top 10 models. Anjali Lavania is also featured in Manish Malhotra's Fashion (2012) with Vidyut Jamwal which was showcased in Delhi Couture week.

Anjali Lavania then took few years off modelling and acting to learn the healing arts of Chakra Healing and Kriya yoga and is an advanced level certified Chakra Healer. Anjali is also a life coach, known as The Ascension Healer and has helped people heal holistically, body, mind and soul. To learn more about Anjali's Ascension Healing Techniques, this is her website. https://www.theascensionhealer.com/about

Filmography

Awards
Won CineMAA Awards for Best New Confident Face for her acting in Panjaa.

References

External links
 Anjali Lavania Enter in South Indian Film Industry
 

Actresses from Mumbai
Female models from Mumbai
1986 births
Living people